Lac du Laouzas is a lake in Tarn, France. At an elevation of 790 m, its surface area is 3.35 km².

Lakes of Tarn (department)